ABALDH may refer to:

 Aminobutyraldehyde dehydrogenase, an enzyme
 1-pyrroline dehydrogenase, an enzyme